The 2017 Brown Bears football team represented Brown University in the 2017 NCAA Division I FCS football season. They were led by 20th-year head coach Phil Estes and played their home games at Brown Stadium. They are a member of the Ivy League. They finished the season 2–8, 0–7 in Ivy League play, to finish in eighth place. Brown averaged 4,858 fans per game.

Schedule
The 2017 schedule consisted of four home games, five away games, and one game against Dartmouth at Fenway Park in Boston. The Bears hosted Ivy League foes Princeton and Penn, and traveled to Harvard, Cornell, and Columbia.

As in 2016, Brown's non-conference opponents were Bryant of the Northeast Conference, Rhode Island of the Colonial Athletic Association, and Stetson of the Pioneer Football League.

Game summaries

Bryant

Harvard

Rhode Island

Stetson

Princeton

Cornell

Penn

Yale

Dartmouth

Columbia

References

Brown
Brown Bears football seasons
Brown Bears football